Randall Robinson (born 31 December 1984) is a Bermudian cricketer. Robinson is a right-handed batsman who bowls right-arm fast-medium.

In January 2008, Bermuda were again invited to part in the 2008 Stanford 20/20, where Robinson made a single Twenty20 appearance against Guyana in the first round. Bermuda made 62/9 from their twenty overs, with Robinson contributing a single run before he was dismissed by Mahendra Nagamootoo. Guyana's won the match by nine wickets.

References

External links
Randall Robinson at ESPNcricinfo
Randall Robinson  at CricketArchive

1984 births
Living people
Bermudian cricketers